Jake E. Areman (born March 9, 1996) is an American soccer player who currently plays for the Tampa Bay Rowdies in the USL Championship.

Raised in Freehold Township, New Jersey, Areman played prep soccer at Colts Neck High School.

Career

College and amateur
Areman played college soccer at the University of Maryland from 2013 to 2014, before transferring to Monmouth University in 2015.

While at college, Areman also appeared for USL PDL club New York Red Bulls U-23 in 2017.

Professional
Areman signed with United Soccer League side Charlotte Independence on March 1, 2018. He scored his first professional goal on August 25, 2018 against North Carolina FC.

Following Charlotte's self-relegation to USL League One, Areman remained in the USL Championship by signing with the Tampa Bay Rowdies.

References

1996 births
Living people
American soccer players
Maryland Terrapins men's soccer players
Monmouth Hawks men's soccer players
New York Red Bulls U-23 players
Charlotte Independence players
Tampa Bay Rowdies players
Soccer players from New Jersey
USL League Two players
USL Championship players
People from Freehold Township, New Jersey
People from West Long Branch, New Jersey
Sportspeople from Monmouth County, New Jersey
Association football midfielders